Russell Maurice Johnson (born 1947), also known as The Bedroom Strangler, is a Canadian serial killer and rapist who was convicted of raping and murdering at least three women in London and Guelph in the 1970s, although the total number of victims later turned out to be higher. He was found not guilty by reason of insanity, and indefinitely confined at Waypoint Centre for Mental Health Care in Penetanguishene.

Murders
In the span of four years, Johnson, an automotive store clerk and weightlifter who worked for Ford Motor Company of Canada in Talbotville, raped and strangled at least seven women in their apartments in London and Guelph. He would stalk his victims to their apartments, waiting until he thought they were asleep, gaining access to their apartments by scaling the outside walls, sometimes for many stories to enter. There, he attacked them, sometimes watching the women sleep before sexually assaulting and suffocating them. Aside from his murders, he non-fatally assaulted 11 other women in the same area.

Victims
 Mary-Catherine Hicks (20)
 Alice Ralston (42)
 Eleanor Hartwick
 Doris Brown (49)
 Diane Beitz (23) - Beitz's body was found on New Year's Eve, 1974, by her boyfriend James Britton, with whom she had been engaged to the previous night. She had been strangled with a brassiere and her hands tied behind her back with a nylon stocking. She had been raped after death. The Guelph police offered a $5,000 reward for any clues leading to the discovery of her killer, while also searching for a dark-coloured, four-door Buick automobile seen parked at the rear of the apartment building in the early morning. At the time of her murder, Johnson was visiting his father in Guelph, and knew of Beitz because his ex-wife used to live in the same apartment building.
 Louella Jeanne George (23) - George was killed in April 1977, after Johnson climbed to her fourth-floor apartment balcony and barged in, raping and killing her on the spot.
 Donna Veldboom (22) - Veldbloom, who lived in the apartment above Johnson's, was strangled to death in July 1977.

Arrest, trial and imprisonment
In July 1977, Russell Johnson was arrested on charges of murdering three of the women: Beitz, George and Veldbloom. According to Police Inspector Robert Young, the man, who had voluntarily admitted himself to the London Psychiatric Hospital in 1969 and diagnosed as a sexual deviant, had told him that he wouldn't have killed the girls if he had gotten proper medical treatment. At trial, Johnson claimed to have had an "uncontrollable urge" to rape and kill.

In the beginning, Johnson pleaded not guilty for the three killings before the Ontario Supreme Court. Much to the surprise of the parties present, Johnson additionally admitted to perpetrating four other homicides and 11 non-fatal assaults. As he demonstrated an incapability to grasp the harshness of the crimes, Johnson was found not guilty by reason of insanity and indefinitely confined to the Waypoint Centre for Mental Health Care.

Aftermath
The investigation surrounding Johnson's crimes was the costliest in Ontario's history, amassing at least $30,000 in expenses. Every year, Johnson applies for more lenient conditions at his facility, which is constantly battled over with the family members of his victims. He has been chemically castrated, and takes Lupron to reduce his testosterone. In 2012, the Ontario Court of Appeals rejected his plea to be moved to the Brockville Mental Health Centre.

Bibliography

See also
List of serial killers by country

References

1947 births
20th-century Canadian criminals
Canadian male criminals
Canadian prisoners and detainees
Canadian rapists
Canadian serial killers
Living people
Male serial killers
Necrophiles
People from St. Thomas, Ontario
Prisoners and detainees of Canada
Violence against women in Canada